Jesús Davoz Gorrotxategi (19 December 1931 – 20 May 2021) was a Spanish road racing cyclist. He won stage 6 of the 1958 Vuelta a Andalucía. He also rode in the 1958 Vuelta a España and 1959 Vuelta a España.

Davoz Gorrotxategi died in Lezo on 20 May 2021, aged 89.

References

External links
 

Spanish male cyclists
1931 births
2021 deaths
People from Errenteria
Sportspeople from Gipuzkoa
Cyclists from the Basque Country (autonomous community)